Liposomal daunorubicin (trade name DaunoXome) is a chemotherapy drug that is FDA approved to treat AIDS related Kaposi's sarcoma.  It is also commonly used to treat specific types of leukaemia and non-Hodgkin lymphoma. Liposomal daunorubicin is intravenously administered.  It utilizes the liposomal carrier system that provides a favorable pharmacokinetic profile at the site of KS lesions resulting in a 10-fold increase in concentrations compared to that which is achieved with conventional preparations.

See also
 Daunorubicin

External links 
 Women&Cancer Magazine Liposomal daunorubicin
 Johns Hopkins AIDS Service - New from the Food and Drug Administration (FDA)
 "DaunoXome", Drugs.com explanation

Topoisomerase inhibitors